Hamilton Secondary College (formerly Mitchell Park Boys Technical College) resides in Mitchell Park, a suburb of Adelaide, South Australia. The school provides secondary education from year 7 to 12, an Adult campus for mature-age students and a Disability Unit. Hamilton Secondary College offers learning in all areas of the mandated curriculum, with comprehensive ICT, science and visual arts programs. The school is a lead school in the 'Trade Schools for the Future' program that enables students from Year 10 to gain practical skills for work while they are still at school. As such, the school offers 14 VET certificates, five of which are available to secondary students. The secondary campus consists of the middle school, Years 7 to 10, and the senior school, Years 11 to 12. Adult students study a wide range of pre-SACE, SACE, certificate, pre-university and vocational courses at the adult campus. Students with disabilities are catered for with individual programs within the purpose-built Disability Unit, called the Flato Centre.

The school was established in 1958 as Mitchell Park Boys Technical High School and became co-educational in 1972. The amalgamation of Glengowrie High School and Mitchell Park Boys Technical College in 1991 prompted the school to be renamed Hamilton, after the Hamilton family, prominent winegrowers in the area.

Hamilton Secondary College participates in the international space school program, which is a facility that cost 5 million dollars and is a 40m room with lights and sand (and incomplete sentences). and has close links with the United States Space Program. Each year, students from Hamilton and other schools are involved in a series of activities led by Space School Manager.

In November 2021 the school opened a new building and revamped several other build to allow for the incoming students for the next year which included the transition of year 7 students from primary to secondary schools. as of 16th Feb 2022 the Flato centre is undergoing renovations to allow for a greater range of disabilities and a greater number of students with year seven entering schooling at Hamilton. as part of the redevelopment the school received a new canteen and a planetarium for the students to utilise as part of the space school. it also received a new performing arts centre with a stage with seating for about 150 seats.

The school offers the renowned Media Arts Production School. In a 1999 article written by Bronwyn Hurrell and published in The Advertiser, Professor Julie James Bailey, author of Reel Women: Working in Film and Television and former Professor of Film and Media at Griffith University, says she 'came across the media course at Hamilton Secondary College and was extremely impressed,' pointing out that ‘It’s the only (course) that feeds into the commercial TV stations having some knowledge of equipment. It’s the only course I’m aware of in the whole of Australia.’

Notable alumni
 Phoenix Spicer – Australian rules football player (North Melbourne)

References

External links 
 Hamilton Secondary College Official Website
 Hamilton Secondary College Facebook Page

Public schools in South Australia
Educational institutions established in 1958
Special interest high schools in South Australia
1958 establishments in Australia
Secondary schools in Adelaide
High schools in South Australia